

Preseason 
Baseball pioneer and former Phillies manager Harry Wright had died in October 1895. The National League declared April 13, 1896 to be "Wright Day", and the Phillies, along with the other clubs playing that day, dedicated their gate receipts to a memorial in Wright's memory. Wright's arrival as Phillies manager in 1884 brought immediate credibility to the fledging organization, and he exerted a positive influence on the growth of baseball in the area. 

The Philadelphia Inquirer wrote, "Harry Wright came to this city in the zenith of his powers as a base ball manager, and what he did for the development of the local end of the national game of base ball is a matter of history. It was here that he passed the evening of his life, beloved by all whose good fortune it was to know him. Here it was that he had his little home stake, and here in the impressive silence of beautiful West Laurel Hill his mortal remains lie buried. His work was an honor to Philadelphians, who will doubtless turn and give substantial evidence of their appreciation of that honor."

The Inquirer rallied the city's amateur base ball organizations to attend the game in numbers. 4,000 fans attended the Phillies exhibition game at Philadelphia Ball Park against the Atlantic League Philadelphia Athletics, raising $1,400 for the Wright memorial.

Regular season

Season standings

Record vs. opponents

Roster

Player stats

Batting

Starters by position 
Note: Pos = Position; G = Games played; AB = At bats; H = Hits; Avg. = Batting average; HR = Home runs; RBI = Runs batted in

Other batters 
Note: G = Games played; AB = At bats; H = Hits; Avg. = Batting average; HR = Home runs; RBI = Runs batted in

Pitching

Starting pitchers 
Note: G = Games pitched; IP = Innings pitched; W = Wins; L = Losses; ERA = Earned run average; SO = Strikeouts

Other pitchers 
Note: G = Games pitched; IP = Innings pitched; W = Wins; L = Losses; ERA = Earned run average; SO = Strikeouts

Relief pitchers 
Note: G = Games pitched; W = Wins; L = Losses; SV = Saves; ERA = Earned run average; SO = Strikeouts

References 

1896 Philadelphia Phillies season at Baseball Reference
1896 Philadelphia Phillies roster at Baseball Almanac

Philadelphia Phillies seasons
Philadelphia Phillies season
Philadelphia Phillies